Salvatore Guidotti (Naples, 1836 - After 1889) was an Italian painter.

Biography
He began as a student of architecture, but then studied painting, only to join the military, and later, law. He studied painting with Francesco Mancini (1830-1905). By 1869, he settled again to paint, and among his works are Orlando Furioso (exhibited at Florence); L'arrivo alla barriera, (exhibited at Rome) ; A Field of Goats and A Market (exhibited at the Promotrice of Naples); La caccia alle farfalle e Una rosa fra le spine (exhibited at  1887 Exposition of Naples).

References

1836 births
Italian genre painters
19th-century Italian painters
Italian male painters
Painters from Naples
Year of death missing
19th-century Italian male artists